Blastobasis argillacea is a moth in the  family Blastobasidae. It was described by Thomas de Grey, 6th Baron Walsingham in 1897. It is found in the West Indies.

References

Natural History Museum Lepidoptera generic names catalog

Blastobasis
Moths described in 1897
Moths of the Caribbean